Yelta may refer to:

Yelta (tugboat)
Yelta, South Australia
Yelta, Victoria, Australia